Ukulele was a Taiwanese pop duet that formed in 1991 and disbanded in 1996. The band was composed of Lee Chi and Terry Lin. They made their debut with the album Confession in 1991, and they have published 6 studio albums, 1 compilation album until disbanded in 1996, then they have published 2 compilation albums. In 2006, they performed their first and only concert in Taipei, Taiwan.

Discography

Studio albums

Compilation albums

Awards and nominations

References 

Taiwanese musical groups
Mandopop musical groups
Musical groups established in 1991
Musical groups disestablished in 1996
1991 establishments in Taiwan
1996 disestablishments in Taiwan